Julie Parrish (born Ruby Joyce Wilbar; October 21, 1940 – October 1, 2003) was an American actress.

Early life
Parrish was born Ruby Joyce Wilbar on October 21, 1940, in Middlesboro, Kentucky, to William Robert "Bob" Wilbar (1913-1988) and Gladys Wilbar (nee Gladys Marie Webb, 1911–1998). She had five younger siblings, sisters Barbara, Janice, and Liza, and brothers James and Robert. Julie was of English descent. . She spent her early years in Lake City, Tennessee, (now Rocky Top, Tennessee), before moving to Tecumseh, Michigan, at age 11. There she graduated from high school. Parrish then attended a modeling school in Toledo, Ohio. She won a national contest for "Young Model of The Year" at a modeling school chain.

Career
Parrish first appeared as an actress in the Jerry Lewis movies It's Only Money (1962) and The Nutty Professor (1963), and in a small role in Harlow (1965). After some guest appearances on television series, and roles in films such as Winter A-Go-Go (1965) and Fireball 500 (1966), she co-starred with Elvis Presley in Paradise, Hawaiian Style (1966). Her later film credits included roles in The Doberman Gang (1972), The Time Machine (1978) and The Devil and Max Devlin (1981).

Parrish also made guest appearances in many television series such as Death Valley Days, Gunsmoke (“The Warden” in 1964), My Three Sons, Family Affair, Star Trek, Bonanza, Murder, She Wrote, Capitol and Beverly Hills, 90210. She had lead roles on several television soap operas and was the female lead in the short-lived 1967 CBS Television sitcom, Good Morning World.

Parrish's theater credits include Absence of a Cello and Memo. In Los Angeles, she received an L.A. Drama Critics Award for her portrayal of Maggie in Arthur Miller's After the Fall. She was also a writer and contributed essays, articles, and book reviews to many publications. Parrish began undergraduate studies in her late forties, earning a degree in Chemical Dependencies Counseling. She worked for nine years as a full-time on-staff counselor at the Haven Hills Shelter for Battered Women.

Death
After a long battle with ovarian cancer, she died of complications from the disease in Los Angeles, California, at the age of 62 in 2003.

Filmography

References

External links

 

1940 births
2003 deaths
People from Middlesboro, Kentucky
20th-century American actresses
Actresses from Kentucky
Actresses from Michigan
American film actresses
American stage actresses
American television actresses
Deaths from cancer in California
Deaths from ovarian cancer
People from Tecumseh, Michigan
People from Rocky Top, Tennessee
21st-century American women